Kanni is a large village in Kawkareik Township 
of northern Kyain Seikgyi Township, Kawkareik District, in the Kayin State of Myanmar. It lies on the left (western) bank of the Haungtharaw (Haungthayaw) River just upstream (south) of where it flows into the Gyaing River.

Notes

External links
 "Kanni Map — Satellite Images of Kanni" Maplandia World Gazetteer

Populated places in Kayin State